McMaster University, located in Hamilton, Ontario, Canada, is a public research university that was founded in 1887 through funds bequeathed by Canadian Senator, William McMaster. It has grown into an institution of more than 32,000 students, faculty, and staff. The school is consistently ranked as one of the best in Canada. The list is drawn from faculty, alumni and staff.

Notable alumni
Fields with a — have unknown values.

Academia and research

Educators

Professors and researchers

Business

Entertainment

Journalism and media

Literature

Medicine

Politics and public service

Religion

Sports

Miscellaneous

Faculty

Chancellors and Presidents
 
From 1888 to 1949, the head of the university was given the title Chancellor. In 1949, the office of President was created and George P. Gilmour was both President and Chancellor. In 1950 his title changed to President and Vice-Chancellor. From that time onward, the University had both a Chancellor as well as a President and Vice-Chancellor. The office of Vice-Chancellor has always been held by the incumbent president of the university.

Chancellor
McMaster University has had 19 Chancellors in office since its existence. In the two years between the retirement of Chancellor MacVicar and the appointment of Chancellor Rand (1890–1892), the Faculties of Art and Theology were organized under the Chairmanship of Dr. Rand and Dr. Goodspeed, respectively.

Presidents and Vice-Chancellors
 
The university has had seven Presidents and Vice-Chancellors since the office was created in 1950.

See also
List of McMaster University Olympic athletes, coaches and officials
:Category:McMaster University alumni
:Category:McMaster University faculty

Notes

References

Macmaster
McMaster University
Macmaster University